Juan de Albi was a Spanish Carthusian of the Convent Val-Christ, near Segovia, date of birth uncertain; died 27 December 1591. He was familiar with the Oriental languages, especially Hebrew, and had the reputation of being a skilled commentator. His work is: Sacrarum semioseon, animadversionum et electorum ex utriusque Testamenti lectione commentarius et centuria (Valencia, 1610); it was re-edited in Venice, 1613, under the title Selectæ Annotationes in varia utriusque Testamenti loca difficiliora.

See also

References

Year of birth missing
1591 deaths
Carthusians